Kamensk crater is an impact crater located  to the south of Kamensk-Shakhtinsky town in Rostov Oblast, Russia. The crater is not exposed at the surface. It may have formed at the same time as the smaller and nearby Gusev crater.

Description 
Six laser total-fusion analyses of the Kamensk impact glass have a weighted-mean age of 49.2 ± 0.1 Ma relative to sanidine from the Taylor Creek Rhyolite of New Mexico, that has an age of 27.92 Ma relative to a K-Ar age of 162.9 ± 0 Ma for a primary fluence-monitor standard SB-3 biotite or of 513.9 Ma for an international hornblende standard MMhb-1. This isotopic age of the Kamensk glass recalculated using a reference age for MMhb-1 of 520.4 Ma is 49.9 ± 0.1 Ma.

References 

Impact craters of Russia
Eocene impact craters
Landforms of Rostov Oblast